The sprouts of capitalism, seeds of capitalism or capitalist sprouts are features of the economy of the late Ming and early Qing dynasties (16th to 18th centuries) that mainland Chinese historians have seen as resembling developments in pre-industrial Europe, and as precursors of a hypothetical indigenous development of industrial capitalism. Korean nationalist historiography has also adopted the idea. In China the sprouts theory was denounced during the Cultural Revolution, but saw renewed interest after the economy began to grow rapidly in the 1980s.

Origins of the idea

The Chinese term was first used in the first chapter, "Chinese Society", of The Chinese Revolution and the Chinese Communist Party, edited by Mao Zedong in 1939:

Similar ideas had been explored by Chinese Marxists in the 1920s and 1930s, and provided a way of reconciling Chinese history with Karl Marx's five stages of modes of production: primitive, slavery, feudal, capitalist and socialist.

Shang Yue and other Chinese historians sought to justify Mao's hypothesis in the 1950s, producing a series of papers collected in two volumes entitled Essays on the debate on the sprouts of capitalism in China published in 1957 and 1960.
They identified a number of developments in the Chinese economy between the 16th and 18th centuries, including improved farming and handicraft technologies, improvement and expansion of markets, and changes in wage labor relationships.
These developments were compared to earlier changes in European economies, and held to constitute a new proto-capitalist phase of Chinese economic history.
Some versions of the theory held that indigenous development of industrial capitalism was forestalled by the 17th-century Manchu invasion or 19th-century conflicts with European powers such as the Opium War,
while others believed that the sprouts were always weak and had withered by the 19th century.

Later history of the idea

These ideas were also explored by Japanese historians of China in the 1950s, though they concluded that a decisive transformation was unlikely.
In 1980 the late-Ming historian Mori Masao said this work "failed to produce satisfactory theoretical results, though it uncovered a wealth of historical facts which had hitherto been unknown".
Western economic historians have tended to dismiss the suggestion that these developments presaged a capitalist transformation.

In China, Shang Yue and the "sprouts" theories were denounced in the Anti-rightist Movement and Cultural Revolution for their emphasis on capitalism, and for contradicting Mao's emphasis on Chinese reaction to Western imperialism in the 19th century.
The fall of the Gang of Four in 1976 and the resurgence of the Chinese economy in the 1980s led to renewed Chinese interest in these ideas.
A notable contribution was the 3-volume A History of the Development of Capitalism in China, by Wu Chengming and colleagues in 1985, with the second volume dealing with the sprouts of capitalism.
There have been few publications in the area since the early 1990s.
Wu Chengming himself abandoned the idea in the late 1990s.
Many Chinese historians now accept that the "sprouts" did not amount to a decisive new phase of economic development.

Economists such as Philip Huang and Li Bozhong have attacked "sprouts" research and other approaches measuring Chinese economic history against developments in Western Europe. They challenge the underlying assumption of a single path of development reflected by the European experience, and argue that focusing on similarities with Europe distorts the study of Chinese history.

Parallels identified in the sprouts literature 

The sprouts researchers tended to identify the expansion of markets with capitalism.
In an influential study in 1957, Fu Yiling placed the origin of the sprouts in a 16th-century "commercial revolution".
Chinese exports to the West generated an inflow of silver from the Americas which expanded the money supply, driving the monetization of markets and taxation.
The following centuries saw increased regional specialization and the
integration of rural markets.

Researchers have pointed to the rise of wage labour in late Ming and early Qing workshops in textile, paper and other industries.
However, they lacked the production accounting methods found in European factories, achieving large-scale production by using many small workshops, each with a small team of workers under a master craftsman.

The organization of silk weaving in 18th-century Chinese cities was compared with the putting-out system used in European textile industries between the 13th and 18th centuries.
As the interregional silk trade grew, merchant houses began to organize manufacture to guarantee their supplies, providing silk to households for weaving as piece work.
In contrast to Europe, where putting-out aimed to harness rural labour to bypass the urban guild system, the Chinese system was a mechanism of spreading risk.
In addition, although putting-out began much earlier in continental Europe, it was only in the English cotton industry that it led to industrialization.

Korean historiography 

Korean nationalist historians advanced a "sprouts" theory as a counter to the claim that Korean industrialization was the "offspring" of Japanese industrialization.
According to this theory, farmers responded to the 17th-century labour shortage caused by foreign invasions by adopting more efficient farming methods, leading to greater commercialization and proto-industrialization, which was curtailed by the Japanese interference from the late 19th century.
It became the orthodox theory in school textbooks in both North and South Korea.
However, since the 1980s South Korean historians have largely discredited the theory.

Books
 
 
 

See also
 Asiatic mode of production
 Economic history of China before 1912
 Great Divergence
 Proto-industrialization

References

Works cited

 
 
 
 
 
 
 
 
 
 
 
 
 
 
 
 
 
 

Capitalism
Economic history of China
Historiography of China